George Spero may refer to:

 George Spero (politician) (1894–1960), British politician
 George Spero (footballer) (born 1941), Australian footballer